Punjabi Braille is the braille alphabet used in India for Punjabi.  It is one of the Bharati braille alphabets, and largely conforms to the letter values of the other Bharati alphabets.

Alphabet 
The alphabet is as follows.  Vowel letters are used rather than diacritics, and they occur after consonants in their spoken order.  For orthographic conventions, see Bharati Braille.

Pointing

The Bharati point, is only used to derive one consonant, ਗ਼ ġa , from the base consonant letter ਗ ga .  This system also operates in Hindi Braille and Indian Urdu Braille, but the Punjabi Braille alphabet is closer to Indian Urdu, as all other consonants that are pointed in print, such as ਖ਼ xa, are rendered with dedicated letters in braille based on international values.  The six pointed letters in the Gurmukhi script have the following equivalents in braille:

Codas
Points are used for syllable codas.

Punctuation
See Bharati Braille#Punctuation.

References

Bharati braille alphabets
Punjabi language
Gurmukhī script